Maafaru (Dhivehi : މާފަރު. ) is one of the inhabited islands of Noonu Atoll in the Maldives.

Geography

Demography

Transport
Maafaru International Airport was built in 2018, having a  runway, and built with aid from the Abu Dhabi Fund for Development.

References

Islands of the Maldives